Pagenstecher's crow (Euploea doretta) is a species of nymphalid butterfly in the Danainae subfamily. It is endemic to Papua New Guinea.

References

Euploea
Insects of Papua New Guinea
Butterflies described in 1894
Taxonomy articles created by Polbot